Acapulcoites are a group of the primitive achondrite class of stony meteorites.

Naming and history
The acapulcoites are named after the only specimen of the group, with a witnessed fall. The Acapulca meteorite fell on 11 August 1976 at 11:00 near El Quemado Colony, outside Acapulco, Guerrero, Mexico. Following that discovery, 52 meteorite specimens have been classified as acapulcoites.

Chemical composition
Acapulcoites are primarily composed of olivine, orthopyroxene, plagioclase, meteoric iron, and troilite. 

Like all primitive achondrites, acapulcoites have chemical composition and mineralogical similarities with chondrites, some specimen even show relic chondrules. Their mineral composition lies between H and E chondrites.

See also
 Glossary of meteoritics

References

Achondrite meteorites